Ferry County is a county located on the northern border of the U.S. state of Washington. As of the 2020 census, the population was 7,178, making it the fourth-least populous county in Washington. The county seat and largest city is Republic. The county was created out of Stevens County in February 1899 and is named for Elisha P. Ferry, the state's first governor.

History
During the time of Washington Territory, the Territorial Legislature created Stevens County in 1863, containing all the land from the Columbia River to the Cascades north of the Wenatchee River from Walla Walla County. On January 20, 1864, the original Spokane County was dissolved and merged with the unorganized Stevens County. The western section of Stevens County was separated on February 18, 1899, and named Ferry County, in recognition of the Territory's last governor and the State's first governor, Elisha P. Ferry.

The town of Republic is the county's seat of government, as well as the largest town. It was founded at the end of the nineteenth century by gold prospectors and was incorporated in 1900. The original election precinct of Republic was created on April 6, 1898. Following the 1922 primary elections, a group of citizens called for an investigation into possible election irregularities.  The group claimed that two of that years voting precincts had been formed unlawfully in conjunction with misconduct in six precincts by election officers and the canvassing board.  As a result of the actions, the validity of two candidates were called in question. Demands were made that Thomas F. Barker, seeking re-election as sheriff, and John W. McCool, seeking the County Treasurer seat, be barred from the ballot.  Barker was notably facing charges at the federal level at that time from allegations of conspiring and abetting bootleggers.

The original county courthouse, made of wood, burned in 1934. Its replacement, made of concrete and stucco, is presently being considered for historical preservation.

Economy
Ferry County reaches to Canada on the north, and to the Columbia River on the east. Its southern portion is in the boundary of the Colville Indian Reservation, controlled by the Colville Confederated Tribes, and its northern portion is largely occupied by Colville National Forest. As a result, only eighteen percent of the total county area is taxable-use ground. The county's economy is largely based on timber-extraction, and mining.

Ferry County's topography and climate make it an ideal recreation destination, so tourism is becoming a significant portion of the county's economy. Washington State Highway 20, designated a National Scenic Highway, crosses the county east–west, and has the state's highest navigable pass (5,575 feet above sea level).

The county seat, Republic, is the site of the Stonerose Interpretive Center and Fossil Site, which exhibits and explains Eocene-era fossils from an ancient lake bed north of Republic.

Geography
Most of the county is covered by the rugged Kettle River Range, which extends from the Canada–US border to its southernmost perimeter bounded by the Columbia River and Lake Roosevelt. Only a narrow north–south strip running the length of the county on the west between the San Poil River and the Okanogan County line is covered by the Okanogan Highland. Except for the town of Republic, the county is sparsely populated.

Geographic features

Major rivers and lakes

Columbia River
Kettle River
Sanpoil River
Franklin D. Roosevelt Lake, called Lake Roosevelt
Curlew Lake
Swan Lake
Ferry Lake
Fish Lake
Long Lake

Adjacent counties
Kootenay Boundary Regional District, British Columbia, north
Stevens County, east
Lincoln County, southwest
Okanogan County, west

National protected areas
 Pacific Northwest National Scenic Trail (part)
 Colville National Forest (part)
 Lake Roosevelt National Recreation Area (part)

Demographics

2000 census
As of the census of 2000, there were 7,260 people, 2,823 households, and 1,987 families living in the county. There were 3,775 housing units at an average density of 2 per square mile (1/km2). The racial makeup of the county was 75.48% White, 0.21% Black or African American, 18.28% Native American, 0.29% Asian, 0.06% Pacific Islander, 2.23% from other races, and 3.46% from two or more races. 2.82% of the population were Hispanic or Latino of any race. 14.1% were of German, 9.5% United States or American, 9.1% Irish, and 7.6% English ancestry. 96.7% spoke English and 1.9% Spanish as their first language.

There were 2,823 households, out of which 30.10% had children under the age of 18 living with them, 54.70% were married couples living together, 10.20% had a female householder with no husband present, and 29.60% were non-families. 24.80% of all households were made up of individuals, and 9.10% had someone living alone who was 65 years of age or older. The average household size was 2.49 and the average family size was 2.95.

In the county, the population was spread out, with 26.90% under the age of 18, 7.60% from 18 to 24, 23.40% from 25 to 44, 29.50% from 45 to 64, and 12.60% who were 65 years of age or older. The median age was 40 years. For every 100 females there were 107.70 males. For every 100 females age 18 and over, there were 105.20 males.

The median income for a household in the county was $30,388, and the median income for a family was $35,691. Males had a median income of $32,103 versus $23,371 for females. The per capita income for the county was $15,019. About 13.30% of families and 19.00% of the population were below the poverty line, including 20.40% of those under age 18 and 10.30% of those age 65 or over.

2010 census
As of the 2010 census, there were 7,551 people, 3,190 households, and 2,070 families living in the county. The racial makeup of the county was 76.3% white, 16.7% American Indian, 0.7% Asian, 0.3% black or African American, 0.1% Pacific islander, 1.2% from other races, and 4.8% from two or more races. Those of Hispanic or Latino origin made up 3.4% of the population. In terms of ancestry, 23.0% were German, 18.0% were English, 12.3% were Irish, and 3.7% were American.

Of the 3,190 households, 23.9% had children under the age of 18 living with them, 49.2% were married couples living together, 9.2% had a female householder with no husband present, 35.1% were non-families, and 28.5% of all households were made up of individuals. The average household size was 2.29 and the average family size was 2.75. The median age was 47.3 years.

The median income for a household in the county was $35,485 and the median income for a family was $43,576. Males had a median income of $41,755 versus $30,972 for females. The per capita income for the county was $18,021. About 13.6% of families and 20.8% of the population were below the poverty line, including 24.3% of those under age 18 and 12.4% of those age 65 or over.

Government

County law enforcement
County-wide law enforcement is provided by the Ferry County Sheriff Office which is headquartered in Republic. Henry Waisman was the county's first sheriff, appointed by the county commissioners following the county's 1899 organization, with a mandate to serve until the first general election in 1900. The county's first elected sheriff was A.E. Stewart. During 2016 the sheriff was Ray Maycumber.

Communities

City

Republic (county seat)

Census-designated places

Barney's Junction
Barstow
Boyds
Curlew
Curlew Lake
Danville
Inchelium
Keller
Laurier
Malo
Orient
Pine Grove
Torboy
Twin Lakes

Other unincorporated communities

Covada
Goldstake
Harter
Impach
Karamin
Kewa
Meteor
Orient
Toroda
West Fork

Notable people
Alex N. Dragnich (1912-2009) - political scientist
Stella Leach (1918-2010) - nurse and activist

See also
Ansorge Hotel
Ferry County Carousel
National Register of Historic Places listings in Ferry County, Washington
List of law enforcement agencies in Washington (state)

References

Further reading
Available online through the Washington State Library's Classics in Washington History collection

External links
 Ferry County, Washington at HistoryLink.org
 Official website of Ferry County Government
 SummitPost.org, Kettle River Range (Washington State)

 Sheriff's office official website

 
1899 establishments in Washington (state)
Populated places established in 1899
Eastern Washington